Juan José Paz (born September 24, 1980 in Santa Cruz de la Sierra) is a Bolivian judoka, who competed in the men's half-lightweight category. Paz qualified as a lone judoka for the Bolivian squad in the men's half-lightweight class (66 kg) at the 2004 Summer Olympics in Athens, by granting a tripartite invitation from the International Judo Federation. He conceded his opening match with a single shido penalty and succumbed to a single leg takedown (kuchiki taoshi) and a 1–0 score on waza-ari from Australia's Heath Young after five minutes of regulation.

References

External links

1980 births
Living people
Bolivian male judoka
Olympic judoka of Bolivia
Judoka at the 2004 Summer Olympics
Sportspeople from Santa Cruz de la Sierra
South American Games bronze medalists for Bolivia
South American Games medalists in judo
Competitors at the 2002 South American Games